Astakhov Glacier is the glacier next south of Chugunov Glacier in the Explorers Range, Bowers Mountains. It flows northeast from Mount Hager and enters Ob' Bay just west of Platypus Ridge, the glacier is situated in Victoria Land, Antarctica. It was mapped by the United States Geological Survey from surveys and from U.S. Navy air photos, 1960–65, and named by the Advisory Committee on Antarctic Names for Petr Astakhov, Soviet exchange scientist at the U.S. South Pole Station in 1967. The glacier lies on the Pennell Coast, a portion of Antarctica lying between Cape Williams and Cape Adare.

See also
 List of glaciers in the Antarctic
 Glaciology

References
 

Glaciers of Pennell Coast